Acrostalagmus is a genus of fungi belonging to the family Hypocreaceae.

The genus was described in 1838 by Corda.

Species:
 Acrostalagmus albus
 Acrostalagmus luteoalbus

References

Hypocreaceae
Hypocreales genera
Taxa named by August Carl Joseph Corda
Taxa described in 1838